This is a list of films produced by the Tollywood (Telugu language film industry) based in Hyderabad in the year 1998.

Box office collection

Share collections

List of released films

Dubbed films

References

1998
Telugu
 Telugu films
1998 in Indian cinema